Michael Stevenson (born 1943) is President Emeritus and Vice-Chancellor of Simon Fraser University. He retired on August 31, 2010, and was succeeded by Andrew Petter on September 1, 2010. Stevenson's appointment as President of Simon Fraser University spanned a decade, the longest term of any president in the history of the university.

Education
Born in South Africa, Michael Stevenson completed his undergraduate education in history and politics at the University of the Witwatersrand, followed by graduate work in the United States with a PhD from Northwestern University. He was awarded the top graduate student fellowship, a national Bobbs-Merrill Prize for graduate studies in political science and was later was awarded a post-doctoral Rockefeller Foundation Fellowship for teaching and research in Nigeria.

Career
Before his appointment as President of Simon Fraser University, he served as Dean of the Faculty of Arts, and as Vice-President Academic and Provost at York University. He has served as Chair of the British Columbia Council for International Education, and Chair of the Council of Western Canadian University Presidents. Additionally, he served on the Board of the Mathematics of Information Technology and Complex Systems (MITACS), as Chair of the University Presidents’ Council of British Columbia, Chair of the Standing Committee on Educational Issues and Funding of the Association of Colleges and Universities of Canada, as a Director on the Vancouver Board of Trade, the BC Business Council, Genome BC and EBound Canada. He serves on the Boards of the Vancouver Opera, the British Columbia Achievement Foundation, the PuSh International Festival for the Performing Arts and the Advisory Council of the Vancouver Indian Summer Festival.

References

University of the Witwatersrand alumni
Northwestern University alumni
Simon Fraser University people
Living people
1953 births